Selected Works: 1972–1999 is a compilation box set by the Eagles, released in 2000. The box set consists of four CDs featuring their greatest hits, album tracks, previously unreleased live performances recorded on 29–31 December 1999 in Las Vegas and Los Angeles and a 44-page booklet. This set chronicles their work from their debut 1972 self-titled album Eagles to the 1999 millennium concert performed at the Staples Center in Los Angeles, December 31, 1999.

Track listing

Credits
 Glenn Frey – vocals, acoustic guitar, electric guitar, harmonica, keyboards, harmonium, synthesizer, piano, clavinet, Wurlitzer electric piano, slide guitar (all discs)
 Don Henley – vocals, drums, percussion, acoustic guitar, electric guitar, synthesizer (all discs)
 Randy Meisner – vocals, bass, guitarron (discs 1, all tracks except 3, 10 and 11 on disc 2 and tracks 2, 5, 10, 11 and 14 on disc 3)
 Bernie Leadon – vocals, electric guitar, acoustic guitar, banjo, mandolin, pedal steel guitar (discs 1, tracks 4, 6, 8, 12 and 13 on disc 2 and tracks 2 and 10 on disc 3)
 Don Felder – electric guitar, acoustic guitar, slide guitar, pedal steel guitar, Hammond organ, backing vocals (tracks 2–3 on disc 1, all songs except tracks 6 & 8 on disc 2 and all songs on discs 3 and 4)
 Joe Walsh – vocals, electric guitar, acoustic guitar, Fender Rhodes, Hammond organ, synthesizer, piano, slide guitar (tracks 2, 3, 5, 7, 9–11 on disc 2, all tracks except 2 and 10 on disc 3 and all tracks on disc 4)
 Timothy B. Schmit – vocals, bass (tracks 3, 10 and 11 on disc 2, all tracks except 2, 5, 10, 11 and 14 on disc 3 and all tracks on disc 4)

Sidemen
 Jim Ed Norman – piano, string arrangements
 David Sanborn – alto saxophone
 Scott Crago – drums, percussion

Technical
 Glyn Johns – record production, engineer
 Bill Szymczyk – record production, engineer

Charts

Weekly charts

Year-end charts

Certifications

References

Eagles (band) compilation albums
2000 compilation albums
Elektra Records compilation albums
Warner Music Group compilation albums